You Ching (born 20 March 1942) was the Republic of China (Taiwan) representative to Germany. A practicing lawyer since 1978, he obtained his bachelor's degree in law from the National Chengchi University in 1965 and his doctorate from the University of Heidelberg in 1978. You was elected as the first non-Kuomintang member of the Control Yuan in 1980. He first served as a member of the Legislative Yuan from 1987 to 1989, and then served two terms as the magistrate of Taipei County from 1989 to 1997. He was again elected to the legislature in 2001 and reelected in 2004.

You Ching's younger brother You Hung was a member of the Legislative Yuan between 1993 and 1999.

References

1942 births
Living people
Democratic Progressive Party Members of the Legislative Yuan
Party List Members of the Legislative Yuan
Kaohsiung Members of the Legislative Yuan
Taipei Members of the Legislative Yuan
Members of the 1st Legislative Yuan in Taiwan
Members of the 5th Legislative Yuan
Members of the 6th Legislative Yuan
Magistrates of Taipei County
National Chengchi University alumni
Heidelberg University alumni
Taiwanese political party founders
Taiwanese Members of the Control Yuan